The Modrow government refers to the final socialist government of the German Democratic Republic (GDR), which was led by Socialist Unity Party (SED) official Hans Modrow from November 1989 until East Germany's first democratically elected government took power on 18 March 1990.

Background 

Spurred on by the liberal policies of Glasnost and Perestroika in the Soviet Union, and Mikhail Gorbachev's apparent tolerance of liberal reforms in other countries in the Warsaw Pact, protests began to spread in the German Democratic Republic in 1989. This culminated in a large increase in citizens escaping from the country during the summer of 1989 after Hungary dismantled its portion of the Iron Curtain. At the same time opposition to the incumbent SED was growing - on 9 October 1989, for example, 70,000 people took part in a demonstration in Leipzig calling for free elections and other democratic rights which had been denied to East German citizens since the founding of the GDR. On 18 October 1989 Erich Honecker was ousted as leader by his Politburo as a result of his unwillingness to confront the societal problems which had led to the mass exodus and political protest. The relatively youthful Egon Krenz who was chosen as successor proved to be ineffective, and on 9 November 1989 the Berlin Wall was opened, becoming a symbol of the SED's complete loss of power. Within the first four days of the Wall's opening, 4.3 million people or 25% of the East German population had made the trip across the border to West Germany with many choosing to remain there to take advantage of the higher quality of life. Since 8 November a new Politburo had been in power when the previous one had unanimously resigned. Amongst the new members was former First Secretary of the SED in Dresden Hans Modrow. Despite the personnel change the new government was unable to bring stability to the situation, with increased absenteeism through emigration and citizens taking trips to West Germany placing higher pressure on the East German economy.

Formation

Round Table 
As a result of the increasingly fragmented nature of the East German political landscape

Government of National Responsibility

Ministers 
 Acting Foreign Secretary: Harry Ott
 Chairman of the State Council and Chairman of the National Defence Council: Egon Krenz (until 6 December 1989), thereafter Manfred Gerlach
 Chairman of the State Planning Commission: Gerhard Schürer
 Deputy Chairpersons: Christa Luft, Lothar de Maizière and Peter Moreth
 General of the People's Police: Lothar Arendt
 Head of the Office for National Security: Wolfgang Schwanitz
 Minister for Economic Questions: Christa Luft
 Minister for Work and Wages: Hannelore Mensch
 Ministers Without Portfolio: Wolfgang Ullmann, Rainer Eppelmann, Sebastian Pflugbeil, Gerd Poppe, Walter Romberg, Tatjana Böhm, Klaus Schlüter and Matthias Platzeck
 Secretary of State: Wolfgang Rauchfuß

See also 
 Die Wende
 German Reunification

References 

Government of East Germany
1989 establishments in East Germany
1990 disestablishments in East Germany
Historic German cabinets